Per Henriksen may refer to:
 Per Henriksen (Danish footballer) (1929-2007)
 Per Henriksen (Norwegian footballer) (born 1952)